20 minutes ( vingt minutes) is a free, daily newspaper aimed at commuters in France. In Switzerland, the French-language edition 20 minutes and the German-language edition 20 Minuten are published by Tamedia.

Rossel noted that the news outlet had 22.4 million monthly users while ratings firm Médiamétrie reported in 2017 that it received 16 million unique users per month. In Greater Paris, Ipsos and CESP confirmed a circulation of 805,000 with a readership of 2,339,000. 20 minutes claims that its readers are "young urban citizens (15–40 years old) that to a lesser extent consume traditional newspapers."

The French 20 minutes was launched in Paris on 15 March 2002, and spread to 11 other urban areas of France, including, in order of size, the cities of Marseille, Lyon, Toulouse, Nice, Nantes, Strasbourg, Montpellier, Bordeaux, Lille, Rennes and Grenoble. Each edition includes both national pages and regional sections.

Since its launch, 20 minutes has led the market of free French newspapers.
In March 2014, due to the fall of advertising revenues (-6% en 2013), TF1 and Bolloré, owners of 20 minutes competitors —Metronews and Direct Matin—, announced their willingness to buy 20 minutes and merge their activities.

The name 20 minutes refers to the amount of time it should take one to read this daily newspaper.

References

External links
Website

2002 establishments in France
Newspapers established in 2002
Newspapers published in Paris
Free daily newspapers
Daily newspapers published in France